Sankaradas Swamigal (7 September 1867 – 13 November 1922) was a Tamil writer, actor, playwright, songwriter and drama producer whose boys company is known for launching the careers of Tamil artists such as S. G. Kittappa, K. B. Sundarambal, M. R. Radha, S. V. Venkataraman and K. Sarangapani. Sankaradas Swamigal is considered one of the pioneers of Tamil theatre along with Pammal Sambandha Mudaliar.

Early life 
Swamigal was born in Tuticorin in 1867 to Damodaran Pillai and Kanthimathi Ammal. He studied Tamil under the tutelage of his father and later, Palani Dandapani Swamigal before joining a salt factory as an accountant.

Career 
Swamigal was more interested in composing Tamil venbas and songs and in 1891, he quit his job at the age of twenty four. With the support of two drama producers, Ramudu Iyer and Kalyanarama Iyer, Swamigal began acting in plays. After a short while, Swamigal joined the drama company of Samy Naidu.

Ar the insistence and encouragement of Manpoondia Pillai, Swamigal began writing plays. His first success was Pammal Sambandha Mudaliar's Manoharan for which he wrote the songs.

References 
 

1867 births
1922 deaths
Writers in British India
Tamil dramatists and playwrights
Indian theatre managers and producers
Indian theatre directors